Morochów  (Morokhiv) is a village in the administrative district of Gmina Zagórz, within Sanok County, in the Subcarpathian Voivodeship (province) of south-eastern Poland.

The Ukrainian population of Morochów has been expelled by the Polish government in 1947, during the Operation Vistula. Nowadays, Morochów has a population of 300.

See also
Komańcza Republic (November 1918 – January 1919)

References

Villages in Sanok County